"A Little Bit More" is a R&B song by singer Melba Moore. The second single released from her album A Lot of Love and feature added vocals by soul singer Freddie Jackson, also featured on his second album Just Like the First Time. It was her most successful on the R&B Songs chart, where it spent one week at number one.  The single failed to make the Hot 100.

Track listings and formats
US, 7-inch single
A. "A Little Bit More" (Radio edit) – 4:15
B. "When We Touch (It's Like Fire)" – 4:25

UK, 12-inch single
A. "A Little Bit More" (LP version) – 4:54
B. "Calling"  – 5:30
B1. "It's Been So Long" (Remix) – 6:06

Notes"When We Touch (It's Like Fire" (written and produced by Ernie Poccia, Vaneese Thomas, Wayne Warnacke)"Calling" (written by Keith Diamond, Barry Eastmond, produced by Barry Eastmond)"It's Been So Long" (written by Chad, Howard King, produced by Howard King)

See also
 List of number-one R&B singles of 1986 (U.S.)

References

1986 singles
Melba Moore songs
1986 songs
Songs written by Gene McFadden
Freddie Jackson songs